The Celastrales are an order of flowering plants found throughout the tropics and subtropics, with only a few species extending far into the temperate regions. The 1200 to 1350 species are in about 100 genera. All but seven of these genera are in the large family Celastraceae. The anthophytes are a grouping of plant taxa bearing flower-like reproductive structures. They were formerly thought to be a clade comprising plants bearing flower-like structures.  The group contained the angiosperms – the extant flowering plants, such as roses and grasses – as well as the Gnetales and the extinct Bennettitales.

23,420 species of vascular plant have been recorded in South Africa, making it the sixth most species-rich country in the world and the most species-rich country on the African continent. Of these, 153 species are considered to be threatened. Nine biomes have been described in South Africa: Fynbos, Succulent Karoo, desert, Nama Karoo, grassland, savanna, Albany thickets, the Indian Ocean coastal belt, and forests.

The 2018 South African National Biodiversity Institute's National Biodiversity Assessment plant checklist lists 35,130 taxa in the phyla Anthocerotophyta (hornworts (6)), Anthophyta (flowering plants (33534)), Bryophyta (mosses (685)), Cycadophyta (cycads (42)), Lycopodiophyta (Lycophytes(45)), Marchantiophyta (liverworts (376)), Pinophyta (conifers (33)), and Pteridophyta (cryptogams (408)).

One family is represented in the literature. Listed taxa include species, subspecies, varieties, and forms as recorded, some of which have subsequently been allocated to other taxa as synonyms, in which cases the accepted taxon is appended to the listing. Multiple entries under alternative names reflect taxonomic revision over time.

Celastraceae
Family Celastraceae

Allocassine
Genus Allocassine:
 Allocassine laurifolia (Harv.) N.Robson, indigenous

Cassine
Genus Cassine:
 Cassine aethiopica Thunb. accepted as Mystroxylon aethiopicum (Thunb.) Loes. subsp. aethiopicum, present
 Cassine barbara L. accepted as Cassine peragua L. subsp. barbara  (L.) R.H.Archer, present
 Cassine burkeana (Sond.) Kuntze, accepted as Mystroxylon aethiopicum (Thunb.) Loes. subsp. burkeanum  (Sond.) R.H.Archer, present
 Cassine crocea (Thunb.) Kuntze, accepted as Elaeodendron croceum (Thunb.) DC. present
 Cassine eucleiformis (Eckl. & Zeyh.) Kuntze, accepted as Robsonodendron eucleiforme (Eckl. & Zeyh.) R.H.Archer, present
 Cassine maritima (Bolus) F.Bolus & L.Bolus, accepted as Robsonodendron maritimum (Bolus) R.H.Archer, present
 Cassine matabelicum (Loes.) Steedman, accepted as Elaeodendron matabelicum Loes. 
 Cassine papillosa (Hochst.) Kuntze, accepted as Elaeodendron croceum (Thunb.) DC. present
 Cassine parvifolia Sond., endemic
 Cassine peragua L. indigenous
 Cassine peragua L. subsp. affinis  (Sond.) R.H.Archer, endemic
 Cassine peragua L. subsp. barbara  (L.) R.H.Archer, endemic
 Cassine peragua L. subsp. peragua, indigenous
 Cassine reticulata (Eckl. & Zeyh.) Codd, accepted as Lauridia reticulata Eckl. & Zeyh. present
 Cassine schinoides (Spreng.) R.H.Archer, endemic
 Cassine stuhlmannii (Loes.) Blakelock, accepted as Elaeodendron schlechterianum (Loes.) Loes. present
 Cassine tetragona (L.f.) Druce, accepted as Lauridia tetragona (L.f.) R.H.Archer, present
 Cassine tetragona (L.f.) Loes., accepted as Lauridia tetragona (L.f.) R.H.Archer, present
 Cassine tetragona (Thunb.) Loes., accepted as Lauridia tetragona (L.f.) R.H.Archer, present
 Cassine transvaalensis (Burtt Davy) Codd, accepted as Elaeodendron transvaalense (Burtt Davy) R.H.Archer, present

Catha

Genus Catha:
 Catha abbottii A.E.van Wyk & M.Prins, accepted as Lydenburgia abbottii (A.E.van Wyk & M.Prins) Steenkamp, A.E.van Wyk & M.Prins, present
 Catha campestris (Eckl. & Zeyh.) C.Presl, accepted as Putterlickia pyracantha (L.) Szyszyl. indigenous
 Catha edulis (Vahl) Forssk. ex Endl. indigenous
 Catha transvaalensis Codd, accepted as Lydenburgia cassinoides N.Robson, present

Celastrus
Genus Celastrus:
 Celastrus campestris Eckl. & Zeyh. accepted as Putterlickia pyracantha (L.) Szyszyl. indigenous
 Celastrus obtusus Thunb. accepted as Putterlickia pyracantha (L.) Szyszyl. indigenous
 Celastrus pyracanthus L. accepted as Putterlickia pyracantha (L.) Szyszyl. endemic
 Celastrus saxatilis Burch. accepted as Putterlickia saxatilis (Burch.) Jordaan, endemic
 Celastrus tetragonus Thunb. accepted as Lauridia tetragona (L.f.) R.H.Archer, present
 Celastrus verrucosus Sond. accepted as Putterlickia verrucosa (E.Mey. ex Sond.) Szyszyl. endemic

Elachyptera
Genus Elachyptera:
 Elachyptera parvifolia (Oliv.) N.Halle, indigenous

Elaeodendron

Genus Elaeodendron:
 Elaeodendron croceum (Thunb.) DC. indigenous
 Elaeodendron transvaalense (Burtt Davy) R.H.Archer, indigenous
 Elaeodendron zeyheri Spreng. ex Turcz. indigenous

Empleuridium
Genus Empleuridium:
 Empleuridium juniperinum Sond. endemic

Gloveria
Genus Gloveria:
 Gloveria integrifolia (L.f.) Jordaan, endemic

Gymnosporia

Genus Gymnosporia:
 Gymnosporia angularis (Sond.) Sim, accepted as Gymnosporia heterophylla (Eckl. & Zeyh.) Loes. present
 Gymnosporia angularis (Sond.) Sim var. grandifolia  Davison, accepted as Gymnosporia grandifolia (Davison) Jordaan, present
 Gymnosporia angularis (Sond.) Sim var. orbiculata  Davison, indigenous
 Gymnosporia arenicola Jordaan, indigenous
 Gymnosporia bachmannii Loes. endemic
 Gymnosporia buxifolia (L.) Szyszyl. indigenous
 Gymnosporia capitata (E.Mey. ex Sond.) Loes. endemic
 Gymnosporia crataegiflora Davidson, accepted as Gymnosporia woodii Szyszyl. present
 Gymnosporia devenishii Jordaan, endemic
 Gymnosporia elliptica (Thunb.) Schonland, endemic
 Gymnosporia filiformis Davidson, endemic
 Gymnosporia gariepensis Jordaan, indigenous
 Gymnosporia glaucophylla Jordaan, indigenous
 Gymnosporia grandifolia (Davison) Jordaan, indigenous
 Gymnosporia graniticola Jordaan, accepted as Gymnosporia swazica Jordaan 
 Gymnosporia harveyana Loes. indigenous
 Gymnosporia harveyana Loes. subsp. harveyana, indigenous
 Gymnosporia hemipterocarpa Jordaan, indigenous
 Gymnosporia heterophylla (Eckl. & Zeyh.) Loes. indigenous
 Gymnosporia linearis (L.f.) Loes. indigenous
 Gymnosporia linearis (L.f.) Loes. subsp. lanceolata  (E.Mey. ex Sond.) Jordaan, indigenous
 Gymnosporia linearis (L.f.) Loes. subsp. linearis, endemic
 Gymnosporia macrocarpa Jordaan, endemic
 Gymnosporia maranguensis (Loes.) Loes. indigenous
 Gymnosporia markwardii Jordaan, indigenous
 Gymnosporia mossambicensis (Klotzsch) Loes. indigenous
 Gymnosporia mossambicensis (Klotzsch) Loes. var. rubra  (Harv.) Loes. indigenous
 Gymnosporia nemorosa (Eckl. & Zeyh.) Szyszyl. indigenous
 Gymnosporia oxycarpa (N.Robson) Jordaan, indigenous
 Gymnosporia polyacantha (Sond.) Szyszyl. endemic
 Gymnosporia polyacantha (Sond.) Szyszyl. subsp. polyacantha, endemic
 Gymnosporia polyacantha (Sond.) Szyszyl. subsp. vaccinifolia  (P.Conrath) Jordaan, endemic
 Gymnosporia pubescens (N.Robson) Jordaan, indigenous
 Gymnosporia putterlickioides Loes., indigenous
 Gymnosporia putterlickioides Loes. subsp. putterlickioides, indigenous
 Gymnosporia rubra (Harv.) Loes. endemic
 Gymnosporia saxatilis (Burch.) Davison, accepted as Putterlickia saxatilis (Burch.) Jordaan, endemic
 Gymnosporia senegalensis (Lam.) Loes. indigenous
 Gymnosporia swazica Jordaan, indigenous
 Gymnosporia tenuispina (Sond.) Szyszyl. indigenous
 Gymnosporia uniflora Davison, indigenous
 Gymnosporia vanwykii (R.H.Archer) Jordaan, endemic
 Gymnosporia woodii Szyszyl. endemic

Hartogiella
Genus Hartogiella:
 Hartogiella schinoides (Spreng.) Codd, accepted as Cassine schinoides (Spreng.) R.H.Archer, present

Hippocratea
Genus Hippocratea:
 Hippocratea africana (Willd.) Loes. accepted as Loeseneriella africana (Willd.) N.Halle var. africana, present
 Hippocratea africana (Willd.) Loes. var. richardiana  (Cambess.) N.Robson, accepted as Loeseneriella africana (Willd.) N.Halle var. richardiana  (Cambess.) N.Halle, present
 Hippocratea buchananii Loes. accepted as Reissantia buchananii (Loes.) N.Halle 
 Hippocratea crenata (Klotzsch) K.Schum. & Loes. accepted as Loeseneriella crenata (Klotzsch) R.Wilczek ex N.Halle var. crenata, present
 Hippocratea delagoensis Loes. accepted as Prionostemma delagoensis (Loes.) N.Halle var. delagoensis, present
 Hippocratea indica Willd. accepted as Reissantia indica (Willd.) N.Halle var. orientalis  N.Halle & B.Mathew, present
 Hippocratea longipetiolata Oliv. accepted as Pristimera longipetiolata (Oliv.) N.Halle, present
 Hippocratea parviflora N.E.Br. accepted as Reissantia parviflora (N.E.Br.) N.Halle 
 Hippocratea parvifolia Oliv. accepted as Elachyptera parvifolia (Oliv.) N.Halle, present
 Hippocratea schlechteri Loes. var. peglerae  Loes. accepted as Pristimera bojeri (Tul.) N.Halle, present

Lauridia

Genus Lauridia:
 Lauridia reticulata Eckl. & Zeyh. endemic
 Lauridia rupicola Eckl. & Zeyh. accepted as Lauridia reticulata Eckl. & Zeyh. present
 Lauridia tetragona (L.f.) R.H.Archer, indigenous

Loeseneriella
Genus Loeseneriella:
 Loeseneriella africana (Willd.) N.Halle, indigenous
 Loeseneriella africana (Willd.) N.Halle var. richardiana  (Cambess.) N.Halle, indigenous
 Loeseneriella crenata (Klotzsch) R.Wilczek ex N.Halle, indigenous
 Loeseneriella crenata (Klotzsch) R.Wilczek ex N.Halle var. crenata, indigenous

Lydenburgia
Genus Lydenburgia:
 Lydenburgia abbottii (A.E.van Wyk & M.Prins) Steenkamp, A.E.van Wyk & M.Prins, endemic
 Lydenburgia cassinoides N.Robson, endemic

Maurocenia
Genus Maurocenia:
 Maurocenia frangula Mill. endemic
 Maurocenia frangularia Willd., accepted as Maurocenia frangula Mill. endemic

Maytenus

Genus Maytenus:
 Maytenus abbottii A.E.van Wyk, endemic
 Maytenus acuminata (L.f.) Loes. indigenous
 Maytenus acuminata (L.f.) Loes. var. acuminata, indigenous
 Maytenus albata (N.E.Br.) E.Schmidt bis & Jordaan, indigenous
 Maytenus bachmannii (Loes.) Marais, accepted as Gymnosporia bachmannii Loes. present
 Maytenus capitata (E.Mey. ex Sond.) Marais, accepted as Gymnosporia capitata (E.Mey. ex Sond.) Loes. present
 Maytenus cordata (E.Mey. ex Sond.) Loes. endemic
 Maytenus deflexa (Sprague) E.Schmidt bis & Jordaan, endemic
 Maytenus heterophylla (Eckl. & Zeyh.) N.Robson subsp. glauca  N.Robson, accepted as Gymnosporia glaucophylla Jordaan, present
 Maytenus ilicina (Burch.) Loes. endemic
 Maytenus lucida (L.) Loes. endemic
 Maytenus monococca (Davison) Loes. endemic
 Maytenus mossambicensis (Klotzsch) Blakelock, accepted as Gymnosporia mossambicensis (Klotzsch) Loes. indigenous
 Maytenus mossambicensis (Klotzsch) Blakelock var. rubra  (Harv.) Blakelock, accepted as Gymnosporia rubra (Harv.) Loes. present
 Maytenus nemorosa (Eckl. & Zeyh.) Marais, accepted as Gymnosporia nemorosa (Eckl. & Zeyh.) Szyszyl. present
 Maytenus oleoides (Lam.) Loes. endemic
 Maytenus oleosa A.E.van Wyk & R.H.Archer, endemic
 Maytenus oxycarpa N.Robson, accepted as Gymnosporia oxycarpa (N.Robson) Jordaan, present
 Maytenus peduncularis (Sond.) Loes. indigenous
 Maytenus polyacantha (Sond.) Marais, accepted as Gymnosporia polyacantha (Sond.) Szyszyl. indigenous
 Maytenus procumbens (L.f.) Loes. indigenous
 Maytenus pubescens N.Robson, accepted as Gymnosporia pubescens (N.Robson) Jordaan, present
 Maytenus putterlickioides (Loes.) Exell & MendonÃ§a, accepted as Gymnosporia putterlickioides Loes. subsp. putterlickioides, present
 Maytenus senegalensis (Lam.) Exell, accepted as Gymnosporia senegalensis (Lam.) Loes. present
 Maytenus tenuispina (Sond.) Marais, accepted as Gymnosporia tenuispina (Sond.) Szyszyl. present
 Maytenus undata (Thunb.) Blakelock, indigenous
 Maytenus vanwykii R.H.Archer, accepted as Gymnosporia vanwykii (R.H.Archer) Jordaan, present

Mystroxylon

Genus Mystroxylon:
 Mystroxylon aethiopicum (Thunb.) Loes. indigenous
 Mystroxylon aethiopicum (Thunb.) Loes. subsp. aethiopicum, endemic
 Mystroxylon aethiopicum (Thunb.) Loes. subsp. burkeanum  (Sond.) R.H.Archer, endemic
 Mystroxylon aethiopicum (Thunb.) Loes. subsp. schlechteri  (Loes.) R.H.Archer, indigenous
 Mystroxylon pubescens Eckl. & Zeyh. accepted as Mystroxylon aethiopicum (Thunb.) Loes. subsp. aethiopicum, present
 Mystroxylon reticulatum (Eckl. & Zeyh.) D.Dietr. accepted as Lauridia reticulata Eckl. & Zeyh. present

Pleurostylia
Genus Pleurostylia:
 Pleurostylia capensis (Turcz.) Loes. indigenous

Prionostemma
Genus Prionostemma:
 Prionostemma delagoensis (Loes.) N.Halle, indigenous
 Prionostemma delagoensis (Loes.) N.Halle var. delagoensis, endemic

Pristimera
Genus Pristimera:
 Pristimera bojeri (Tul.) N.Halle, indigenous
 Pristimera delagoensis (Loes.) R.H.Archer, indigenous
 Pristimera delagoensis (Loes.) R.H.Archer var. delagoensis, indigenous
 Pristimera longipetiolata (Oliv.) N.Halle, indigenous

Pseudosalacia
Genus Pseudosalacia:
 Pseudosalacia streyi Codd, endemic

Pterocelastrus

Genus Pterocelastrus:
 Pterocelastrus echinatus N.E.Br. indigenous
 Pterocelastrus galpinii Loes. indigenous
 Pterocelastrus rostratus (Thunb.) Walp. indigenous
 Pterocelastrus tricuspidatus (Lam.) Walp. endemic

Putterlickia

Genus Putterlickia:
 Putterlickia neglecta Jordaan, R.G.C.Boon & A.E.van Wyk, indigenous
 Putterlickia pyracantha (L.) Szyszyl. endemic
 Putterlickia retrospinosa A.E.van Wyk & Mostert, endemic
 Putterlickia saxatilis (Burch.) Jordaan, endemic
 Putterlickia verrucosa (E.Mey. ex Sond.) Szyszyl. indigenous

Reissantia

Genus Reissantia:
 Reissantia indica (Willd.) N.Halle, indigenous
 Reissantia indica (Willd.) N.Halle var. orientalis  N.Halle & B.Mathew, indigenous

Robsonodendron
Genus Robsonodendron:
 Robsonodendron eucleiforme (Eckl. & Zeyh.) R.H.Archer, indigenous
 Robsonodendron maritimum (Bolus) R.H.Archer, endemic

Salacia
Genus Salacia:
 Salacia gerrardii Harv. ex Sprague, endemic
 Salacia kraussii (Harv.) Harv. indigenous
 Salacia leptoclada Tul. indigenous
 Salacia rehmannii Schinz, endemic
 Salacia transvaalensis Burtt Davy, accepted as Elaeodendron transvaalense (Burtt Davy) R.H.Archer

References

South African plant biodiversity lists
Celastrales